The Church of Scientology uses front groups to promote its interests in politics, to make itself appear legitimate, and to recruit. Many of the groups are founded on pseudoscience, named disingenuously, and underplay their links to Scientology.

According to Benjamin Beit-Hallahmi, "The majority of activities conducted by Scientology and its many fronts and subsidiaries involve the marketing of secular products such as the "Clear" program, Sterling Management Systems executive training, and self-improvement in scholastics." Some Scientology products are defined as religious in one setting but secular in another. For example, Study Technology is sold in Churches of Scientology but is also taught in some schools under claims of being secular and non-religious.

Scientology is unique among religions for its quantity of front groups, which has been part of its policy since its beginnings and was outlined by Hubbard in his 1960 document "Special Zone Plan". Along with their own front groups, Scientology engages in infiltration of civil society groups and government agencies. Their front businesses are a major source of income for Scientology and are used as a way of obtaining funds from government and charity sources. Per Beit-Hallahmi, "This use of fronts has been a major part of the organization's activities, and it indicates an acknowledgement of having something (or more than just something) to hide."

History 

Following discovery of the Church's Operation Snow White, the FBI's July 7, 1977 raids on the Church's offices produced, among other documents, an undated memo entitled "PR General Categories of Data Needing Coding". This memo listed what it called "Secret PR Front Groups" which included the group Alliance for the Preservation of Religious Liberty (APRL), later renamed Americans Preserving Religious Liberty.

In 1991, Time investigative reporting identified several other fronts for Scientology, including the Citizens Commission on Human Rights (CCHR), The Way to Happiness Foundation, Applied Scholastics, the Concerned Businessmen's Association of America and HealthMed. The article The Thriving Cult of Greed and Power resulted in years of litigation.

The Cult Awareness Network (CAN) was an organization that provided information on cults, as well as support and referrals to deprogrammers. The organisation was founded in 1978 and was eventually overpowered by the Church of Scientology in a series of lawsuits. In its place, the Church of Scientology created the organisation called the New Cult Awareness Network.

In 1998, the Boston Herald identified Narconon and the World Literacy Crusade as front groups for Scientology.
Other Scientology groups include Downtown Medical, Criminon and the Association for Better Living and Education (ABLE).

Other organisations with links to the Church of Scientology include EarthLink and Striker Systems.

Known Scientology front groups

See also 
 List of Scientology organizations
 :Category:Scientology-related schools
 :Category:World Institute of Scientology Enterprises-affiliated organizations

References

Scientology organizations
Front organizations